Splashdown: Rides Gone Wild (also known as Splashdown 2: Rides Gone Wild in Europe) is a 2003 jetski racing video game developed by Rainbow Studios and published by THQ for PlayStation 2 and mobile phones. It is a sequel to the original Splashdown published by Atari, for the PlayStation 2 and Xbox. The game features a career mode where winning races rewards the player with points which can be used to upgrade items or buy new ones. It also features arcade, training and multiplayer modes. An Xbox version was planned but was canceled, as Rainbow Studios was busy working on MX Unleashed.

Reception

The PlayStation 2 version received "favorable" reviews according to the review aggregation website Metacritic.

References

External links

2003 video games
Cancelled Xbox games
Mobile games
Multiplayer and single-player video games
Personal watercraft racing video games
PlayStation 2 games
Rainbow Studios games
THQ games
Video game sequels
Video games developed in the United States